A Howell–Jolly body is a cytopathological finding of basophilic nuclear remnants (clusters of DNA) in circulating erythrocytes.  During maturation in the bone marrow, late erythroblasts normally expel their nuclei; but, in some cases, a small portion of DNA remains. Its presence usually signifies a damaged or absent spleen, because a healthy spleen would normally filter this type of red blood cell.

The Howell–Jolly body is named after William Henry Howell and Justin Marie Jolly.

Appearance

This DNA appears as a basophilic (purple) spot on the otherwise eosinophilic (pink) erythrocyte on a standard H&E stained blood smear. These inclusions are normally removed by the spleen during erythrocyte circulation, but will persist in individuals with functional hyposplenia or asplenia.

Causes
Howell–Jolly bodies are seen with markedly decreased splenic function. Common causes include asplenia (post-splenectomy) or congenital absence of spleen (right atrial appendage isomerism). Spleens are also removed for therapeutic purposes in conditions like hereditary spherocytosis, trauma to the spleen, and autosplenectomy caused by sickle cell anemia. Other causes are radiation therapy involving the spleen, such as that used to treat Hodgkin lymphoma.

Howell–Jolly bodies are also seen in amyloidosis, severe hemolytic anemia, megaloblastic anemia, hereditary spherocytosis, and myelodysplastic syndrome (MDS). The bodies can also can be seen in premature infants.

References

External links
 Digital Pathology, Brown University: Howell-Jolly Bodies

Abnormal clinical and laboratory findings for RBCs